Reni may refer to:

Places 
 Reni, Alwar, Alwar district, Rajasthan, India
 Reni, Chamoli (also Raini), Chamoli district, Uttarakhand, India, devastated by the 2021 Uttarakhand flood
 Reni, Churu, Churu district, Rajasthan, India
 Reni, Ukraine, a city in Odessa Oblast (southern Ukraine) on the border with Romania, near the confluence of Prut and Danube rivers
 Reni Raion, Ukraine
 Reni (island), in West Papua, Indonesia

People 
 Reni (musician) (born 1964), English musician
 Guido Reni (1575–1642), Italian painter
 Reni Erkens (1909–1987), German freestyle swimmer
 Reni Jusis (born 1974), Polish pop singer, songwriter and producer
 Reni Lane (born 1988), American singer-songwriter
 Reni Maitua (born 1982), Australian rugby league footballer
 Reni Masi, Canadian politician
 Reni Santoni (born 1939), American actor
 Reni Takagi (born 1993), Japanese singer
 Reni Yordanova (born 1953), Bulgarian rower

See also 
 René
 Rini (disambiguation)
 Raini (disambiguation)